Hans Nimmerfall (October 25, 1872 – August 20, 1934) was a Bavarian politician of the Social Democratic Party of Germany (SPD).

Nimmerfall was member of the city council of the former city of Pasing (district of Munich since 1938), as well as a member of the Bavarian parliament from 1912 bis 1918 (representative of Pasing and neighborhood). In 1915, he was founder of Pasings' housing co-op "Sporer-Block", and thenceforward president of the association, which aimed for minimize housing shortage. He was chairman of the inaugural meeting of the local SPD associations of Mauth-Finsterau (December 18, 1918) and Aubing-Neuaubing (March 3, 1921). In 1919, he was state council at the Bavarian ministry for military affairs.

After the 1933  and the seizure of power in the im city hall of Pasing by the Nazis, he and others were deported to the Dachau concentration camp in 1933. He was not in the best of health, and died due to the misusages shortly after his release in Pasing.

Bibliography 
 , Volume 1993, .

References and notes 

Politicians from Munich
German cooperative organizers
Social Democratic Party of Germany politicians
German people who died in Dachau concentration camp
1872 births
1934 deaths
Members of the Bavarian Chamber of Deputies
Politicians who died in Nazi concentration camps